Brynjar Ingi Bjarnason (born 6 December 1999) is an Icelandic footballer who plays as a centre-back for Eliteserien club Vålerenga and the Iceland national team.

Club career
On 30 June 2021, he signed a three-year contract with an option for fourth year with Italian club Lecce.

International career
Brynjar Ingi Bjarnason made his international debut for Iceland on 29 May 2021 in a friendly match against Mexico in Arlington, Texas. He scored his first international goal against Poland in Poznań on 8 June 2021.

Career statistics

International

International goals
Scores and results list Iceland's goal tally first.

References

External links
 
 

1999 births
Living people
Brynjar Ingi Bjarnason
Brynjar Ingi Bjarnason
Association football central defenders
Brynjar Ingi Bjarnason
Brynjar Ingi Bjarnason
Brynjar Ingi Bjarnason
Brynjar Ingi Bjarnason
Brynjar Ingi Bjarnason
U.S. Lecce players
Vålerenga Fotball players
Expatriate footballers in Norway
Brynjar Ingi Bjarnason
Brynjar Ingi Bjarnason
Expatriate footballers in Italy
Brynjar Ingi Bjarnason